Dimitar Telkiyski (born 5 May 1977) is a Bulgarian football manager and a former player. He is assistant manager of Levski Sofia. His nickname is Mecho or 'Teddybear', was given to him by the Botev Plovdiv supporters.

Career

Botev Plovdiv
Telkiyski developed his abilities in Botev Plovdiv's Youth Academy between 1990 and 1996. After that, he played three years for the seniors.

Levski Sofia
He joined Levski in 1999 and won three consecutive titles. However, at this time he was used mainly as a substitute. He became a first team regular in 2003. In May 2006, Telkiyski won the Bulgarian championship with Levski for the fourth time. With Levski Sofia he reached 1/4 finals of UEFA Cup in 2005–06. Next season, Levski Sofia with Telkiyski, reached the group-stage of UEFA Champions League, becoming the first Bulgarian team that reached the groups.

Hapoel Tel Aviv
On 3 January 2008, Levski and Hapoel Tel Aviv F.C. agreed on the transfers of Elin Topuzakov and Dimitar Telkiyski. The two players went to Israel. They signed their official contacts with Hapoel on 7 January 2007. Telkiyski chose to play with kit number 31. Both Topuzakov and Telkiyski made their debut for Hapoel Tel Aviv F.C. on 12 January 2008 against Hapoel Kfar Saba. Hapoel Tel Aviv lost the match 2–1. Telkiyski scored his first goal for Hapoel against Maccabi Herzliya, in a 3–2 win.
In 2008, he won the Fan's player of the year award with his teammate Elin Topuzakov.

Amkar Perm
On 18 July 2009, Telkiyski arrived in Perm, to join FC Amkar on an 18-month deal.
On 9 August 2009, he made his debut for the Russian side in the 1:0 away defeat against CSKA Moscow, coming on as a substitute for Nikolai Zhilyaev in the 83rd minute.

Levski Sofia 2nd Period
On 13 October 2009, Telkiyski returned to Bulgaria to sign a contract as a free agent with his former club Levski Sofia. He took the number 32. Mecho immediately started to help his team, assisting 3 goals for 4 matches.

Dimitar ended the season with 16 appearances and 6 assistances. After couple of bad games and results, Levski however achieved qualifying for UEFA Europa League becoming 3rd in the final ranking.

On 31 May 2010, Dimitar's contract was extended to summer of 2012. For the next 10/11 season, Dimitar changed his kit number to 8.

Hapoel Ramat Gan
On 10 August 2010, Telkiyski along with his teammate Elin Topuzakov went to Israel, to join Hapoel Ramat Gan.

Lokomotiv Sofia
In October 2011 Telkiyski return to Bulgaria and sign with Lokomotiv Sofia but leaves it in early December, due to financial problems in the club.

Chernomorets Burgas
On 21 December 2011, Telkiyski signed with Chernomorets Burgas. He played only 4 games because heavy injury received on 21 March. And leaves the club in June, when his contract expired.

Lokomotiv Sofia
In June 2012 Telkiyski returned to Lokomotiv Sofia.

International career
Telkiyski made his debut for the senior national team of his country on 17 November 2004, in the 0:0 draw with Azerbaijan in a friendly match.

Playing style
Telkiyski plays as a winger or as a central midfielder. He is famous with his free-kicks and penalty kicks. His strong foot is the right one. Mecho is a fast player, who can dribble very well, which often makes him hard for marking. He makes a lot of assists.

Career statistics

International goals

Coaching career
In 2016–17, Telkiyski served as head coach of Levski Sofia's U19 team.

On 9 June 2017, Telkiyski was appointed as assistant manager of Second League club Oborishte Panagyurishte.

Awards
  Bulgarian League Champion – 2000, 2001, 2002, 2006, 2007
  Bulgarian Cup – 2000, 2002, 2003, 2005, 2007
  Bulgarian Supercup – 2005, 2007
  UEFA Cup 2005-06: 1/4 finals
  UEFA Champions League 2006-07: Group-stage
  Fan's player of the year award – 2008
  Goal of the year – 1st and 2nd places – 2008

References

External links
 

1977 births
Living people
Bulgarian footballers
Bulgaria international footballers
Bulgarian expatriate footballers
First Professional Football League (Bulgaria) players
Russian Premier League players
Botev Plovdiv players
PFC Levski Sofia players
Hapoel Tel Aviv F.C. players
FC Amkar Perm players
Hapoel Ramat Gan F.C. players
FC Lokomotiv 1929 Sofia players
PFC Chernomorets Burgas players
Expatriate footballers in Israel
Bulgarian expatriate sportspeople in Israel
Expatriate footballers in Russia
Association football midfielders
Footballers from Plovdiv
Bulgarian football managers